Kałek may refer to the following places:
Kałek, Greater Poland Voivodeship (west-central Poland)
Kałek, Łódź Voivodeship (central Poland)
Kałek, Lubusz Voivodeship (west Poland)